The 2016 Kazakhstan Premier League was the 25th season of the Kazakhstan Premier League, the highest football league competition in Kazakhstan. Astana were the defending champions having won their second league championship the previous year, and they successfully defended their title this season. The season began on 12 March 2016 and concluded on 29 October 2016; the relegation play-off took place on 5 November 2016.

Teams
FC Kaisar was relegated at the end of the 2015 season, and was replaced by Akzhayik.

Team overview

Personnel and kits

Note: Flags indicate national team as has been defined under FIFA eligibility rules. Players and Managers may hold more than one non-FIFA nationality.

Foreign players
The number of foreign players is restricted to eight per KPL team. A team can use only five foreign players on the field in each game.

In bold: Players that have been capped for their national team.

Managerial changes

Regular season
In the regular season twelve teams played each other home-and-away in a round-robin format for a total of 22 matches per team. The top six teams advanced to the Championship round and the bottom six teams qualified for the Relegation round.

Regular season table

Regular season results

Championship round
The top six teams from the regular season will participate in the Championship round where they will play each other home-and-away in a round-robin format for a total of 10 matches per team. In contrast to the previous season, teams will carry forward their entire regular season record, with no halving of points. After completion of the Championship round the winners will be the Champions of 2016 Kazakhstan Premier League and qualify for 2017–18 UEFA Champions League second qualifying round. The runners-up and third-placed team will qualify for Europa League first qualifying round and the fourth-placed team will also qualify for Europa League because one of the top three teams will win the 2016 Kazakhstan Cup.

Championship round table

Championship round results

Relegation round
The worst six teams from the regular season participated in the Relegation round where they played each other home-and-away in a round-robin format for a total of 10 matches per team. In contrast to the previous season, teams carried forward their entire regular season record, with no halving of points. After completion of the Relegation round the winners are considered the 7th-placed team of 2016 Kazakhstan Premier League, the runners-up being 8th and so on, with the last team being 12th. The 11th-placed team, Taraz, qualified for the relegation play-off against Altai Semey, the runners-up of 2016 Kazakhstan First Division, with the losing team being eliminated, and the 12th-placed team, Zhetysu, will be directly relegated to 2017 Kazakhstan First Division as the last-placed team.

Relegation round table

Relegation round results

Relegation play-offs

Altai Semey are promoted to the 2017 Kazakhstan Premier League; Taraz are relegated to the 2017 Kazakhstan First Division.

Statistics

Top scorers

Hat-tricks

Scoring
 First goal of the season: Ulan Konysbayev for Atyrau against Zhetysu (12 March 2016)
 Fastest goal of the season: 1st minute,
Raul Jalilov for Tobol against Zhetysu (23 April 2016)
 Latest goal of the season: 90+4th minute,
Alassane N'Diaye for Tobol against Taraz (1 May 2016)
Marat Khairullin for Okzhetpes against Zhetysu (10 May 2016)

References

External links
Official website 

Kazakhstan Premier League seasons
1
Kazakh
Kazakh